Naft Gachsaran Football Club is an Iranian football club based in Gachsaran, Iran. They currently compete in the Iranian League 2.

History
Naft Gachsaran was founded in 1967 by oil workers in the area. For much of the early years of the club, the team played only friendly matches and in local leagues.

After the revolution the club played mainly in the lower leagues of Iranian football. They reached the second tiered Azadegan League in 2013 before returning to League 2 in Iran.

Season-by-Season

The table below shows the achievements of the club in various competitions.

See also
 2011-12 Hazfi Cup
 2011–12 Iran Football's 2nd Division

External links
  Official club website

Football clubs in Iran
Association football clubs established in 2003
2003 establishments in Iran